The Little Lady Next Door is a 1915 short film directed by  B. Reeves Eason.

Cast
 Perry Banks
 Harry Edmondson
 Virginia Fordyce
 Louise Lester
 Jack Richardson
 Vivian Rich
 Walter Spencer

References

External links

1915 films
1915 short films
American silent short films
American black-and-white films
Films directed by B. Reeves Eason
1910s American films